Obaidullah Karimi (born on 21 December 1979) is an Afghan former footballer who played as a forward. He was the only Afghan player to score a goal in a FIFA World Cup qualification when he scored in the 2010 FIFA World Cup qualification (AFC) against Syria.

In his career, he had four metatarsal fractures.

Career statistics

Club

International

Scores and results list Afghanistan's goal tally first, score column indicates score after each Karimi goal.

References

External links
 

1979 births
Living people
Footballers from Kabul
Afghan footballers
Association football forwards
Afghanistan international footballers
Hamburger SV II players
SC Concordia von 1907 players
German people of Afghan descent
FC Eintracht Norderstedt 03 players
Afghan expatriate footballers
Afghan expatriate sportspeople in Germany
Expatriate footballers in Germany